Doctor Who: The 50th Anniversary Collection is a collection of music compiled by Mark Ayres from the first fifty years of Doctor Who that has been released in varying forms by Silva Screen Records.

Releases

Four disc version
The first release of the music was in a four disc edition which was released on 9 December 2013. The track listing was released on 15 November 2013.

Two disc version
A condensed two disc release was prepared for the United States market, with a digital release on 17 December 2013 and a CD release on 4 February 2014. The cover for this US release is the same as the four disc version, but with a blue tint.

Eleven disc version
An expanded, eleven disc set was available for preorder in both a limited edition TARDIS packaging and in a standard clamshell packaging from 25 April 2014. The pre-order for the TARDIS packaging version ended on 9 May 2014, and the pre-order for the clamshell packaging version ended on 16 May 2014. Both eleven disc versions were scheduled for release 25 July 2014. However, in an email sent 14 July 2014 to customers who had ordered them, Silva Screen stated that production delays meant that the revised delivery date would likely be the end of November. Then in an email sent 15 July, it was announced that the standard clamshell eleven disc set would be released 15 September 2014, with the TARDIS set still expected at the end of November. However, an email sent 5 September announced that a printing error necessitated a reprinting of the clamshell release, with the release date being pushed back to 29 September.

Vinyl version
A 50-track, 4 LP vinyl edition was released on 25 February 2016 in a limited number of 1,000 editions.

Track listings

Four disc version

Two disc version

Eleven disc version

Vinyl version

Notes

References

50th Anniversary Collection
2013 soundtrack albums
2014 soundtrack albums
Silva Screen Records soundtracks
Silva Screen Records compilation albums
Soundtrack compilation albums